Kostyantyn Valentynovych Zhevago (born 7 January 1974) is a Ukrainian billionaire and politician. He was the first Eastern European to present one of his companies — Ferrexpo to the London Stock Exchange. Zhevago controls the "Finances and Credit" group — one of largest conglomerates of Ukraine; holds a post of FC Vorskla honorary president. He was a member of the Verkhovna Rada (parliament of Ukraine) from 1998 until 2019.

Early life and career 
Kostyantyn Valentynovych Zhevago was born on 7 January 1974 in the village of Iultin, in Russia's far eastern Magadan Oblast, into the family of a mining engineer.

In 1991, Zhevago entered the Kyiv National Economic University, specialising in accounting and analysis of external economic activity. In 1996, he graduated with a master's degree in economics, and in 2003 he defended his candidate's dissertation on "International investments and effective economic development" at the Kyiv National Economic University.

Business 
While studying, Zhevago began a career in the position of "Finance and Credit" chief financial officer, holding this post from 1993 to 1996.
From 1996 to 1998 he holds posts of "Finances and Credit" president, public corporation "Poltava ore-dressing and processing enterprise" council deputy and is member of public corporation "Ukrnafta" supervisory board.

Kostyantin Zhevago, 35-year-old investor, was the first of the Ukrainian multimillionaires to present one of his companies — Ferrexpo to the London Stock Exchange. In autumn 2007 Ferrexpo was added to the FTSE 250 Index.

Forbes magazine named Kostyantin Zhevago the youngest billionaire in Europe, who made his fortune by himself. His bank "Finances and Credit" was one of the TOP-10 largest Ukrainian banks with hundreds of branches across Ukraine. He controls developed and successful enterprises in mining and metallurgical, shipbuilding, engineering, heavy car production, pharmacology and food industries in Ukraine and countries of Western Europe and Middle East. Owns the football team of Ukrainian Premier League FC Vorskla Poltava.

Political activity 
In Ukraine, Zhevago conducts active political activity. In March 1998, he was first elected as a People's Deputy of Ukraine from Ukraine's 149th electoral district, located in Poltava Oblast. June 1998 — Zhevago Kostyantin is a member of parliament committee of questions of economic policy, state economy management, property and investments. In April 2002, he was re-elected, this time in Ukraine's 150th electoral district (also in Poltava Oblast]]. From June 2002, he was a member of the Verkhovna Rada Legal Committee and a member of the Verkhovna Rada (parliament of Ukraine)'s permanent delegation in PACE.

From May 2006 to April 2007, Zhevago was a People's Deputy of Ukraine from the Yulia Tymoshenko Bloc. In 2007, Zhevago was re-elected as a People's Deputy of Ukraine from the Yulia Tymoshenko Bloc. Leader of deputy group of inter-parliamentary connections with Japan. He missed all 51 parliament sessions in 2010.

Zhevago returned to the Verkhovna Rada once again after the 2012 Ukrainian parliamentary election, winning with more than 60% as an independent candidate in the re-established 150th district. The successors of the Yulia Tymoshenko Bloc, Batkivshchyna, did not have its own candidate in this district. Zhevago did not join a faction in the Verkhovna Rada.

In the 2014 Ukrainian parliamentary election Zhevago was re-elected into parliament again as an independent in the 150th district, this time with 43.81% of the votes. He again did not join a faction.

In the 2019 Ukrainian parliamentary election, Zhevago failed to regain his seat, concluding his twenty-one year career as a People's Deputy. He lost the election in the 150th district with 24.9% of the vote. The winning candidate was Oleksiy Movchan from the Servant of the People party, who won with 41% of the vote.

Controlled assets 
"Finances and Credit" group is to one of the largest Ukrainian conglomerates. It includes enterprises in the fields of metallurgy, ferrous deposits and ferromagnetic ore, engineering, transport, pharmaceutics, shipbuilding, energetics.

"Finances and Credit" bank was founded in 1990 and by the size of assets it was considered one of the largest banks of Ukraine according to classification of National Bank of Ukraine. By 1 April 2009 the authorized capital stock of the bank made ₴2 billion, net wealth made ₴18,316 billion, bank liabilities — ₴15,840 billion. The loan portfolio made ₴15,880 billion, loan portfolio of natural person — bank clients — ₴5,983 billion. By 1 April 2009 the bank system included 16 branches and 326 departments in all areas of Ukraine. The basic shareholders of "Finances and Credit" bank on 01.04.2009 were the close corporation "F&C Realty" (46.67%), LTD "Askaniya" (48.88%) and the state-run Naftogaz (0.63%).
According to the Ukrainian Bank Association data, by 1 April 2009 the bank occupied the 13th place among 162 operating in the country. On 17 December 2016 the National Bank of Ukraine withdrew the banking license of Finance and Credit and liquidated the bank.

"Finances and Credit" group companies 
 Insurance and finances
«Omega» insurance company

 Real estate
Joint-stock company «F&C Realty», Hotel «Salute» Kyiv, Terminal in the seaport "Southern" (Odessa), Institute «Kyivsoyuzdorproekt»

 Energetics
Joint-stock company “Biloterkovna teploelektrotsentral”, Ukrenerhosbyt, Odessaoblenerho, Ukrainian-German «Mega-motors», Luhanskoblenerho

 Chemistry
Joint-stock company «Rosava», joint-stock company “Kremenchug factory of technical carbon”, Stakhanov factory of technical carbon, LTD. “Ukrtekhuglerod”, Zatisnyansk chemical factory

 Engineering
AvtoKrAZ, Uzhgorod «Turbogaz», Kharkov instrumental factory, Stakhanov carriage works, Berdychiv machine-shop «Progress», Poltava machine unit factory

 Shipbuilding
Zaliv Shipbuilding yard, “Kyiv shipbuilding and reconstruction factory”

 Metallurgy and Resources
Poltava GOK (iron-stone, pellet), Skopski Legury (ferro-alloys), Ferreekspo (Switzerland), Electrometallurgical plant «Vorskla Steel» (in the process of building), Electrometallurgical factory «Vorskla steel Denmark»

 Pharmacology
Joint-stock companies “Kyivmedpreparat”, “Gemoplast”, “Halychfarm”.

 Food industry
Private Joint-stock Company Kremenchukmyaso

Wealth 
According to Forbes, he is Ukraine's youngest billionaire. In March 2012 Forbes placed him on the Forbes list of billionaires at the 719th place with $1.8 billion.

Investigation
On 28 December 2022, Zhevago was arrested in Courchevel, France at the request of Ukraine's State Bureau of Investigation. Assets belonging to Zhevago have also been seized, including assets of Ferrexpo. The investigation relates to JSC Finance and Credit Bank.

See also 
 KrAZ
 FC Vorskla Poltava

References

External links 
 Official website of Finance and Credit Bank
 Kyiv National Economic University
 Ferrexpo chief shrugs off shareholder ire, Financial Times,  June 8 2009
 Tycoon rejects 'oligarch' tag, Financial Times,  June 8 2009
 Dossier on Konstyantin Zhevago — Liga dossier
 Kostiantyn Zhevago, exclusive interview - Focus Magazine. January, 2010 (original article)
 Kostiantyn Zhevago, exclusive interview - Focus Magazine. January, 2010 (translation)
 Konstantin Zhevago (dossier) is Focus magazine. December, 21.2007
 Konstantin Zhevago (dossier) is Focus magazine. April, 02.2009
 Konstantin Zhevago (dossier) is Correspondent magazine. September, 8.2008
 Interview with Konstantinom Zhevago. Correspondent magazine. November, 3.2007
 Konstantin Zhevago: it is necessary to keep promises which we gave the market
 Konstantin Zhevago is acknowledged the youngest billionaire of Europe
 
 Profile : Konstantin Zhevago (Finance and Credit Group)
 IPO Ferrexpo
 Ferrexpo manages to stay in the black

1974 births
Living people
People from Chukotka Autonomous Okrug
Russian emigrants to Ukraine
Kyiv National Economic University alumni
21st-century Ukrainian economists
Ukrainian billionaires
Ukrainian football chairmen and investors
Third convocation members of the Verkhovna Rada
Fourth convocation members of the Verkhovna Rada
Fifth convocation members of the Verkhovna Rada
Sixth convocation members of the Verkhovna Rada
Seventh convocation members of the Verkhovna Rada
Eighth convocation members of the Verkhovna Rada
Independent politicians in Ukraine
FC Vorskla Poltava
20th-century Ukrainian businesspeople
21st-century Ukrainian businesspeople
Fugitives wanted by Ukraine
Ukrainian oligarchs